Temelucha is a genus of parasitoid wasps belonging to the family Ichneumonidae, with a cosmopolitan distribution and over 200 constituent species.

References

Ichneumonidae
Ichneumonidae genera